Friederike Herbst (1805-1866) was a stage actor. She was engaged at the Estates Theatre in Prague in 1829-1854, where she belonged to the theatre's star attractions. She was known for her heroine- and character roles  and praised for her ability to improvise and to play the most varied parts.

References 

 Herbst, Friederike; encyklopedie.idu.cz

1805 births
1866 deaths
Czech actresses
19th-century Czech actors